Wayne Osborne (born 14 January 1977) is an English former professional footballer who played as a defender in the Football League for York City and in non-League football for Bishop Auckland.

References

1977 births
Living people
Footballers from Stockton-on-Tees
Footballers from County Durham
English footballers
Association football defenders
York City F.C. players
Bishop Auckland F.C. players
English Football League players